John White Newall (21 July 1917 – 21 January 2004) was an association football player who represented New Zealand at international level.

Newall made his full All Whites debut, a 0–2 loss to New Caledonia on 19 September 1951 and ended his international playing career with 10 A-international caps and an incredible 16 goals to his credit. He scored 4 hat-tricks in official FIFA internationals, including a 4-goal haul in his final cap appearance, a 5–3 win over Tahiti on 28 September 1952.
Including unofficial matches, Newall scored 28 goals in just 17 games for the All Whites, a record only exceeded only by Vaughan Coveny who scored 30, including 29 official international goals in 64 matches, and Chris Wood who scored 33 official international goals in 65 matches

Newall died on 21 January 2004 in Dumfries and Galloway, at the age of 86.

References 

1917 births
2004 deaths
New Zealand association footballers
New Zealand international footballers
Association football forwards
Scottish footballers
Ayr United F.C. players
Footballers from Ayr
Scottish expatriate footballers
Scottish expatriate sportspeople in New Zealand
Expatriate association footballers in New Zealand